The Australian television landscape had changed significantly by the end of 2001, with television ratings data switching suppliers, from The Nielsen Company (formerly, Ac.Nielsen) to industry owned, OzTam, which would be the sole provider of weekly ratings and yearly television archives to present day. The Nielson company was instead relegated to ratings of regional areas and PayTV (which at the time, was at its infancy). Moreover, in 2001, Seven Network ended its 46-year-association with the Australian Football League (AFL) despite being a considerable ratings success for the network, the program would ultimately be broadcast by Network Ten for the following 10 years, eventually reverting to the Seven Network in 2012.

The following is a list of Australian television ratings for the year 2001.

Most Watched Broadcasts in 2001

See also

Television ratings in Australia

References

2001
2001 in Australian television